The 2006 Vermont gubernatorial election took place on November 7. Incumbent Republican Governor Jim Douglas won re-election to a third term, defeating Democratic nominee Scudder Parker.

Candidates

Democratic Party
 Scudder Parker, former Democratic Party Chair, state senator, minister and director of energy efficiency at the Vermont Department of Public Service. Began campaigning in late 2005 and subsequently won the Democratic nomination when no other Democrat filed by the July 16, 2006 deadline. His fundraising efforts resulted in $110,000 in donations in the month of July 2006.

Republican Party
 Jim Douglas, incumbent Governor of Vermont

Liberty Union Party
 Robert Skold, website publisher

Vermont Green Party
 Jim Hogue

United States Marijuana Party
 Cris Ericson

Independents
 Benjamin Clarke

Campaign

Predictions

Polling

Results
Official results from the Vermont Secretary of State:

See also
 2006 United States gubernatorial elections
 2006 United States Senate election in Vermont
 2006 United States House of Representatives election in Vermont

References

External links
Jim Douglas for Governor
Scudder Parker for Governor
Robert Skold for Governor

2006
Gubernatorial
2006 United States gubernatorial elections